A regional election took place in Burgundy on 21 March and 28 March 2004, along with all other regions. François Patriat (PS) was re-elected President of the Council.

Results

References 

Burgundy regional election
Burgundy